The 21st Special Service Group (Abbr.: 21 SSG) is a command for Malaysian Army special forces, the Gerak Khas. The 21 SSG and 10th Parachute Brigade are elite fighting formations of the Malaysian Army. Both units are independent units under the Malaysian Army and report directly to the Chief of Army. The headquarters of the 21 SSG are at Iskandar Camp in Mersing, Johor.

Major General Nubli Hashim is the current commander of the 21 SSG, succeeding Major General Datuk Jamaluddin Jambi on 6 September 2021.

History 
The 21st Special Service Group, previously known as Rejimen Pertama Gerak Khas Malaysia or the 1st Malaysian Special Service Regiment, was established on 1 August 1970, at Sungai Udang Camp in Malacca. This unit was the direct successor to the Malaysian Army's special operations task force, the Malaysian Special Service Unit, as well as the spiritual successor to Malaysia's first modern special forces unit, the Malayan Special Forces.

Background 
Following the end of the Indonesia–Malaysia confrontation in 1966, the army command considered disbanding the Malaysian Special Service Unit (MSSU). The MSSU, which was based at the time in Sebatang Karah Camp, Negeri Sembilan, was a task force whose members were all commando-trained but belonged to their own regiment or corps, and some were sailors from the Royal Malaysian Navy. In 1969, the 13 May incident occurred, and the MSSU was dispatched to Kuala Lumpur to defend the weapon depot located within Mindef Camp. The MSSU is also joining forces with the Royal Malaysia Police's Special Branch to apprehend leaders of gangsters and triads who contributed to the racial tensions behind the scenes during the incident. The incident was short-lived due to the quick response of both units. As a result, the brass decided not to disband the MSSU.

1st Malaysian Special Service Regiment 
Malaysian Army established the 1st Malaysian Special Service Regiment (1 MSSR) in August 1970 to replace the MSSU. As a task force, the MSSU members are still accountable to their original units. To address this issue, by 1973, the MSSU members who wish to join the special forces unit must resign from their original units and volunteer to join the 1 MSSR. Later, in the mid-1970s, the 2nd Malaysian Special Service Regiment (2 MSSR) was formed to cope with the rapidly expanding Malaysian Army special forces. The Special Warfare Training Centre (SWTC) was founded in 1975 to provide the Gerak Khas with commando and special operations training. As the senior unit, 1 MSSR members were chosen as SWTC instructors.

Malaysian Special Service Command 
The Malaysian Army separated the command of special forces from the 1 MSSR on 4 April 1980, by establishing the Malaysian Special Service Command at Imphal Camp in Kuala Lumpur, while the 1 MSSR and 2 MSSR continued to serve as combat units. The Malaysian Army renamed the Malaysian Special Forces Command to Malaysian Special Service Group (MSSG) on 1 April 1981, at the same time that 1 MSSR was renamed to 21st Para Commando Regiment and 2 MSSR was renamed to 22nd Para Commando Regiment. Two new counter-revolutionary warfare units were formed at the same time, the 11th Special Service Regiment (11 SSR) and the 12th Special Service Regiment (12 SSR), to provide specialised support to the Para Commando regiments. Many other support units were established in December 1981 to provide additional combat support to the combat units under MSSG. In 1983, the 12 SSR were disbanded, and the 11 SSR were no longer specially assigned to the 21st Para Commando.

21st Special Service Group 
The MSSG was renamed the 21st Special Service Group in 1985 because the Malaysian Army wanted to standardise the names of the Malaysian Army's units and formalise the unit as the Malaysian Army's 21st brigade. Units under the command of the 21 SSG were also renamed. The 21st Para Commando Regiment became the 21st Commando Regiment and the 22nd Para Commando Regiment became the 22nd Commando Regiment. The 21st Engineering Squadron of the 21 SSG (now known as the 10th Squadron (Parachute), Royal Engineer Regiment) was decommissioned from the 21 SSG in 1986 and transferred to the Malaysian Army's 3rd Infantry Division. The Special Warfare Training Centre was placed under the command of the Malaysian Army Training and Doctrine Command.

Formations

1970–1980 

 1st Malaysian Special Service Regiment
 2nd Malaysian Special Service Regiment

1980–1981 

Malaysian Special Service Command
1st Malaysian Special Service Regiment
2nd Malaysian Special Service Regiment
Special Warfare Training Centre

1981–1983 

Malaysian Special Service Group
21st Para Commando Regiment
11th Special Service Regiment
22nd Para Commando Regiment
12th Special Service Regiment
21st Signals Squadron
21st Engineering Squadron
Garrison Command
21st Composite Company
21st Ordnance Company
21st Military Police Company
21st Workshop Company
Armed Forces Payroll Affairs Company
Special Warfare Training Centre

1983–1985 

Malaysian Special Service Group
11th Counter-revolutionary Warfare Regiment
21st Para Commando Regiment
22nd Para Commando Regiment
21st Signals Squadron
Garrison Command
21st Composite Company
21st Ordnance Company
21st Military Police Company
21st Workshop Company
Armed Forces Payroll Affairs Company
Special Warfare Training Centre

1985–2010s 

21st Special Service Group
11th Special Service Regiment
21st Commando Regiment
22nd Commando Regiment
Signals Squadron, Royal Signals
Garrison Command
Composite Company, Royal Service Corps
21st Company, Royal Ordnance Corps
21st Company, Royal Military Police Corps
21st Squadron (Workshop), Royal Service Corps
Armed Forces Payroll Affairs Company, Royal Service Corps

Current formations

Uniforms and insignia

Green beret 
Members of Gerak Khas inherited the green beret and Fairbairn–Sykes fighting knife as a commando qualification symbol from the Royal Marines Commando. This is because the first batch received commando training at the British Army Jungle Warfare Training School from the 40 Commando Royal Marines. Unlike the British Armed Forces or the U.S. Army, which only allow soldiers, sailors or marines who have completed the Basic Commando Course or the United States Army Special Forces selection and training to wear the green beret, all members of the 21 SSG wear the green beret whether they have completed the Basic Commando Course or not. Members who have completed the Basic Commando Course may wear their unit's beret backing (Malaysian renditions of the U.S. military beret flash) to distinguish themselves from non-commando trained members.

Shoulder sleeve insignia

Number 5 uniform (Combat uniform) 
The insignia, also known as a tactical formation patch, is worn on the combat uniform and is olive and black in colour. The patch features a roaring tiger's head and a commando dagger in the centre.

Number 2 uniform (Bush jacket) 
The 21 SSG personnel wore their command insignia on their number 2 uniform's left shoulder sleeve. The 21 SSG shoulder sleeve insignia is similar to the beret backing but has a black outline. The current insignia is based on the insignia of the Malaysian Special Service Unit, which depicts a roaring tiger's head with a commando dagger in the centre. The background is a combination of jungle green and Caribbean blue. The colour jungle green represents commando specialties while also being the colour of Islam, while Caribbean blue represents the founder, 40 Commando Royal Marines.

Stable belt 
Members of the 21SSG wear their number 3 uniform (work dress) with a green and light blue stable belt.

Commanders 
Since the establishment of the Malaysian Special Service Regiment in 1970, there have been 20 people who have held the position of Commander of Gerak Khas, also known as Panglima Gerak Khas in Malay. The list here is based on the highest rank they achieved before retiring from the service, not the date they held the position.

 Borhan Ahmad – Retired as a General. Before retiring, he served as the 12th Chief of Defense Forces.
 Zaini Mohd Said,  – Retired as a Lieutenant General. Before retiring, he was the Commander of Army Field Command.
 Awie Suboh – Retired as a Lieutenant General. He was the Commander of the 1st Infantry Division before retiring.
 Hasan Ali – Retired as a Lieutenant General. Before retiring, he was the Commander of the 21st SSG.
 Ramli Ismail – Retired as a Major General. Before retiring, he was the Commander of the Malaysian Army Training and Doctrine Command. Died on 13 November 2011.
 Mohd Ghazali Ibrahim – Retired as a Major General. Before retiring, he was the Commander of the Malaysian Army Training and Doctrine Command.
 Mohd Rodi Zakaria – Retired as a Major General. Before retiring, he was the Commander of the Malaysian Army Training and Doctrine Command.
 Abdul Samad Yaacob – Retired as a Major General. Before retiring, he was the Assistant Chief-of-Staff of Malaysian Army Planning and Development.
 Zolkopli Hashim – Retired as a Major General. Before retiring, he was the Commander of the 21st SSG.
 Mohd Fadzil Tajuddin – Retired as a Major General. Before retiring, he was the Commander of the 31st Border Brigade.
 Jamaludin Jambi – Retired as a Major General. Before retiring, he was the Commander of the 21st SSG.
 Hasbullah Mohd Yusof – While still in service, he was killed in a helicopter crash on 8 December 1989. He was the Commander of the 3rd Infantry Brigade at the time and held the rank of Brigadier General.
 Daud Ariffin – Retired as a Brigadier General. Before retiring, he was the Commander of the 21st SSG.
 Muhammad Yassin Yahya – Retired as a Brigadier General. Before retiring, he was the Commander of the 5th Infantry Brigade.
 Harun Hitam – Retired as a Brigadier General. Before retiring, he was the Commander of the 21st SSG.
 Mohd Daniel @ Damien Abdullah – Retired as a Brigadier General. Before retiring, he was the Commander of the 9th Infantry Brigade.
 Effendi Abdul Karim – Retired as a Brigadier General. Before retiring, he was the Commander of the 21st SSG.
 Mazlan Md Sahlan – Retired as a Brigadier General. Prior to his retirement, he served as the Director of Special Operations at Joint Forces Command. Prior to that, he was the commander of National Special Operations Force, a tier 1 special operations unit.
 Khairul Anuar Yaakob – Retired as a Brigadier General. Before retiring, he was the Chief-of-Operation (S3) of the 21st SSG.
 Nubli Hashim – the 21st SSG's current commander.

Notes

See also 
Elite Forces of Malaysia
Malaysian Army 10th Parachute Brigade
 Royal Malaysian Navy PASKAL
 Royal Malaysian Air Force PASKAU
 Malaysia Coast Guard Special Task and Rescue
 Royal Malaysia Police Pasukan Gerakan Khas

References 

Malaysian Army
Formations of the Malaysian Army